The Nut Job is a 2014 computer-animated heist comedy film directed by Peter Lepeniotis, who also wrote the film with Lorne Cameron. It stars the voices of Will Arnett, Brendan Fraser, Liam Neeson, Katherine Heigl, Stephen Lang, Jeff Dunham, Gabriel Iglesias, and Sarah Gadon. The film is loosely based on Lepeniotis' 2005 short animated film Surly Squirrel. Produced by Gulfstream Pictures, Redrover International and ToonBox Entertainment, it was released in the United States on January 17, 2014, by Open Road Films. The film received negative reviews, but grossed $120.9 million worldwide against a production budget of $30 million.

A sequel titled The Nut Job 2: Nutty by Nature was released on August 11, 2017.

Plot

In October 1959 of the fictional town of Oakton City, a squirrel named Surly and his mute rat partner Buddy reside in Liberty Park where their thieving reputation has made them outcasts. A group of urban animals led by Raccoon and his cardinal assistant are running low on food for winter. Compassionate squirrel, Andie, and glory hogging squirrel, Grayson, compete with Surly and Buddy to scavenge from a nut cart run by Lucky and Fingers who are casing a bank. The squirrels' efforts inadvertently end with the cart's propane tank exploding in the park after its cord was bitten by Fingers' pug Precious. The runaway cart ends up destroying the animals' food supply, resulting in Surly's banishment from the park.

In the city, Surly and Buddy find Maury's Nut Shop. Adjacent to the bank, it is a criminal hideout used by Lucky, Fingers, their boss who was recently released from jail Percy "King" Dimpleweed, and Knuckles, who plan to break through the wall and replace the bank's cash with nuts. King's girlfriend Lana believes that King has gone straight after his release from prison and the nut store is legitimate.

Raccoon sends Andie and Grayson to the city to find food, but they get separated when a street rat approaches them. Andie recovers Fingers' dog whistle, which Knuckles threw out and Surly had used against Precious, and threatens to dispose of it if Surly does not share the nuts he is going to take. Surly accepts and unwittingly befriends Precious after threatening her with the whistle. Andie informs the park community of the plan. Raccoon reluctantly goes with the plan (though planning to deny Surly his share) and assigns Mole and the Bruisers to go with her. Surly confronts, interrogates, and eventually learns from Mole that Raccoon's policy is to control the food supply in order to remain as the park community's leader, and is planning on sabotaging the heist to do so. When Andie does not believe him, Surly storms off after Grayson reunites with them. While collecting the nuts, Surly is captured by King, but he gets freed by Lana since he doesn't have the whistle anymore and she finds out that King hasn't changed his criminal ways. She then leaves King.

After fending off street rats who work for Raccoon, Surly and Grayson chase the criminal gang's getaway truck, which carries Raccoon and the others. Surly fights off Cardinal and tosses him straight into a fancy cat show, and Mole defects from Raccoon and reveals the truth to the animals, resulting in Raccoon being voted out of the park community. King and Knuckles use the dynamite inside the empty truck to blow up a police barricade at a dam, but the police shoots the tire on the truck that falls from the dam. It explodes after Surly gets himself and Andie off it, causing the dam to collapse, a flash flood to happen, and everyone falling into the river below. Surly makes it to a log, but finds out that Raccoon, King, and Knuckles survived the explosion. Raccoon tries to kill Surly, but the nuts' & water's weight begins to break the log & push it over a waterfall. The animals arrive to rescue Surly, but Surly, deciding to be selfless in order to protect his friends, lets himself fall into the waterfall with Raccoon. Now seeing the good side of Surly, the park community mourns him as they go home on the river.

The nuts & the flood make their way to Liberty Park where King and his associates are arrested as Lana breaks up with King. Andie and Buddy are still mourning over Surly, and when Precious learns what happened, she has Buddy come look at an unconscious Surly, who wakes up and hugs Buddy. Afterward, Precious leaves to meet Lana, who plans to run Maury's Nut Shop. Finding Surly alive, Andie embraces him and suggests to tell the other animals of his heroism. However, Surly declines, yet gains a willingness to work with others, and goes into the city with Buddy, allowing Grayson to take credit for the nuts making it to the park.

In a mid-credits scene, Raccoon and Cardinal are revealed to still be alive and are plotting revenge, while stuck on a buoy in the ocean, surrounded by hungry sharks circling them.

Cast
 Will Arnett as Surly, a purple squirrel and the main protagonist.
 Brendan Fraser as Grayson, a glory-hogging eastern gray squirrel who has a false reputation for being the "park hero".
 Gabriel Iglesias as Jimmy, a groundhog and the leader of the Bruisers.
 Jeff Dunham as Mole, a clumsy mole who works for Raccoon and has eyes that are sensitive to light.
 Liam Neeson as Norvirus Raccoon, a raccoon and the self-proclaimed, power-hungry, deceitful con-artist and leader of the park who banishes Surly from the same park. Raccoon's also known for his thirst for Surly's blood which later in the film terrorizes Andie due to her affections for Surly.
 Katherine Heigl as Andie, a compassionate and beautiful American red squirrel who eventually becomes Surly's love interest.
 Stephen Lang as Percy "King" Dimpleweed, a mob boss with a fear of vermin.
 Sarah Gadon as Lana, King's girlfriend, later ex-girlfriend.
 Maya Rudolph as Precious, a pug that is owned by Lucky and later Lana.
 James Rankin as Fingers, King's fellow criminal who helps Lucky run "Maury's Nut Shop".
 Scott Yaphe as Lucky, the owner of the peanut cart, who is Precious' owner and King's associate.
 Joe Pingue as Johnny, a groundhog and a member of the Bruisers.
 Annick Obonsawin as Jamie, a small female groundhog and a member of the Bruisers.
 Julie Lemieux as a girl scout that tries to buy nuts from Fingers and Lucky's nut cart.
 Robert Tinkler as Buddy, a rat and Surly's mute and incompetent partner-in-crime who does not talk much
 Robert Tinkler also voices Redline, a mouse who idolizes Grayson and whose catchphrase is "We're all gonna die!"
 James Kee voices an armored truck guard
 James Kee also voices a street rat.
 Scott McCord as a police officer who tries to get Fingers and Lucky to show him a permit for their nut vending.
 Scott McCord also provides the voices of miscellaneous animals.
 Katie Griffin as a park pigeon

Production
The film's concept originated as a 2005 short film titled Surly Squirrel. A second short film, Nuts & Robbers, was released as a teaser for The Nut Job.

On January 17, 2011, it was announced that Lorne Cameron would write the screenplay for the film, along with Peter Lepeniotis. On November 15, 2012, it was announced that Katherine Heigl, Will Arnett and Brendan Fraser had joined the cast of the film, and on March 1, 2013, it was announced that Liam Neeson has also joined. On December 19, 2013, it was announced that South Korean entertainer PSY makes a cameo appearance as himself during the film's ending credits, which also features his hit song "Gangnam Style".

The film's production art was featured in a Brampton, Ontario exhibit.

Release

The film was released in the United States on January 17, 2014, and distributed by Open Road Films. International distribution was handled by The Weinstein Company and Universal Pictures. The first teaser trailer for the film was released on September 27, 2013. The film had its premiere at a Regal Cinemas theater in Los Angeles on January 11, 2014.

Home media
The Nut Job was released on DVD and Blu-ray on April 15, 2014, by Universal Pictures Home Entertainment.

Reception

Critical response
On review aggregator Rotten Tomatoes, the film has an approval rating of 13%, based on 98 reviews, and an average score of 4/10. The site's critical consensus reads, "Hampered by an unlikable central character and source material stretched too thin to cover its brief running time, The Nut Job will provoke an allergic reaction in all but the least demanding moviegoers." On Metacritic, which calculates a normalized rating from reviews, the film has an average weighted score of 37 out of 100, based on 28 critics, indicating "generally unfavorable reviews". Audiences polled by CinemaScore gave the film a "B" grade, on an A+ to F scale.

Peter Debruge of Variety wrote, "The Nut Job comes up short compared with a film like Ratatouille, which, despite its less-than-adorable rodents, won audiences over through appealing voicework and writing." Alonso Duralde of The Wrap wrote, "The Nut Job is merely shrill and frantic, chock-full of uninspired characters and tedious wackiness." Michael Rechtshaffen of The Hollywood Reporter wrote, "A whimsical period setting helps this 3D animated caper escape some overly familiar trappings." Bill Goodykoontz of The Arizona Republic wrote, "Arnett is a great comedic actor, an acidic wit. But here his Surly is just a selfish jerk. If there weren't some redemption involved, this wouldn't be a by-the-numbers animated feature. But it is, and there is, and it is wholly predictable." Linda Barnard of the Toronto Star gave the film two out of four stars, saying, "If The Nut Job fails to connect through its characters it deserves praise for being a visually inspired effort, with clear homage paid to 1950s animation styles, especially Warner Bros. classics." Chris Cabin of Slant Magazine gave the film one out of four stars, saying, "There's no personality in the design or the script, which only renders the cynical aftertaste of this convoluted one-squirrel-against the-world story all the more potent." Jordan Hoffman of the New York Daily News gave the film two out of five stars, saying, "The cartoon is stuffed with exhausting visual mayhem. Some jokes land, but most kids over 10 will roll their eyes."

Joe Williams of the St. Louis Post-Dispatch gave the film one and a half stars out of four, saying, "The burnished backgrounds are pleasant to look at, but finding something to savor in the story is a tough nut to crack." Michael Phillips of the Chicago Tribune gave the film one out of four stars, saying, "The Nut Job fights its protagonist's own charmlessness from the first scene. Turning a dislikable leading character a little less dislikable by the end credits sets an awfully low bar for this sort of thing." Rafer Guzman of Newsday gave the film one and a half stars out of four, saying, "The overall mood resembles a furry, nut-based version of Stanley Kubrick's The Killing." Peter Hartlaub of the San Francisco Chronicle gave the film two out of four stars, saying, "Someone spent a lot of time making the architecture and production design match the era. Grandparents getting dragged to The Nut Job will be appreciative." Annlee Ellingson of the Los Angeles Times wrote, "The Nut Job features decent CG animation, especially of animals, but the writing isn't particularly clever, relying on obvious puns and slapstick humor." Stephanie Merry of The Washington Post gave the film two out of five stars, saying, "That feeling of been-there-done-that is pervasive, with many of the jokes sounding like they were ripped off from other movies." Kevin McFarland of The A.V. Club gave the film an F, saying, "The most egregious problem with The Nut Job is how shamelessly it fills in the gaps left by expanding Lepeniotis’ short with generic and tedious rogue-to-hero cliché." Lou Lumenick of the New York Post gave the film two and a half stars out of four, saying, "The small-town setting of a half-century ago is beautifully animated by director Peter Lepenotis and his team, and there are some nicely staged old-school action sequences."

Scott Bowles of USA Today gave the film one and a half stars out of four, saying, "When the story gets stale, the movie inserts a 'nuts' pun or, worse, resorts to a gas or burp joke. It doesn't work the first time, nor the fifth." Miriam Bale of The New York Times wrote, "The Nut Job features muddy-colored and often ugly animation, a plot that feels too stretched out and loaded with details to hold the attention of most children, and more flatulence jokes than anyone deserves." Adam Nayman of The Globe and Mail gave the film two out of four stars, saying, "Only a multilevel chase sequence involving Surly and some glowing-eyed street rats has any real kinetic excitement, and the supporting characters lack visual distinction." Bill Zwecker of the Chicago Sun-Times gave the film two and a half stars out of four, saying, "The bottom line: Kids may be mildly amused by The Nut Job, but adults accompanying them won't find much to capture their interest." Kimberley Jones of The Austin Chronicle gave the film two out of five stars, saying, "The richly hued CG animation is quite nice – a mix of hyperdetailed character work and painterly cityscapes and pastorals – and the script putters along with small but regular amusements." Tom Russo of The Boston Globe gave the film one and a half stars out of four, saying, "The plot doesn’t take clever turns, the visual thrills aren’t all that thrilling, and you’re ultimately left to get your heist-movie kicks elsewhere." Joel Arnold of NPR wrote, "Once Surly and Buddy case the joint, develop a plan, and deal with the inevitable surprises, The Nut Job could be any classic caper flick."

Box office
The Nut Job grossed over $64 million in North America, and over $56 million in other countries, for a worldwide total of over $120 million. In North America, the film opened at number three in its first weekend, with $19,423,000, behind Ride Along and Lone Survivor. It had the biggest opening weekend ever for an independent animated feature film. In its second weekend, the film stayed at number three, grossing an additional $12 million. In its third weekend, the film dropped to number four, grossing over $7 million, and in its fourth weekend, the film dropped to number eight, grossing over 3 million.

Awards
The Nut Job won the Audience Award for Best Children's Animation at the 2015 Anima: The Brussels Animation Film Festival.

The film was nominated for Best Sound Editing – Feature Film at the 2014 Directors Guild of Canada Awards. Paul Hunter won for The Nut Job in the Best Editing in Animation category at the Canadian Cinema Editors Awards.

The French ATAA awarded the film Best Dubbing Adaptation for an Animated Film for 2015.

Soundtrack
The film's score was composed by Paul Intson. The soundtrack was released on January 17, 2014.

Sequel

On January 23, 2014, The Nut Job 2 was announced, with an initial release date of January 15, 2016. On April 11, 2016, the release date was pushed back to May 19, 2017. Will Arnett, Gabriel Iglesias, Jeff Dunham, Katherine Heigl and Maya Rudolph reprised their roles. The film details the park animals banding together to prevent a crooked mayor from bulldozing Liberty Park and replacing it with a dangerous amusement park. On May 25, 2016, Heitor Pereira was hired to score the film. On July 5, 2016, Jackie Chan joined the cast as territorial street mouse gang leader Mr. Feng. In December 2016, the film was pushed back to August 11, 2017.

References

External links

 
 
 

 
2010s American animated films
2010s buddy comedy films
2010s children's comedy films
2014 3D films
2014 computer-animated films
2014 films
3D animated films
American 3D films
American buddy comedy films
American children's animated comedy films
American computer-animated films
American heist films
Animated buddy films
Animated films about friendship
Animated films about dogs
Animated films about squirrels
Films about raccoons
Animated films about rats
Animated films about mice
Canadian 3D films
Canadian animated feature films
Canadian computer-animated films
Canadian children's animated films
English-language Canadian films
English-language South Korean films
Features based on short films
Films directed by Peter Lepeniotis
Films set in 1959
Gulfstream Pictures films
Open Road Films animated films
South Korean 3D films
South Korean animated films
South Korean children's films
South Korean comedy films
2014 animated films
Canadian independent films
South Korean independent films
2014 comedy films
2010s English-language films
2010s Canadian films
2010s South Korean films
2010s American films
The Weinstein Company animated films
Sidus Pictures films